Michael Grady (born 22 October 1996) is an American rower. He competed in the 2020 Summer Olympics.

References

External links
 Cornell Big Red bio

1996 births
Living people
Rowers from San Francisco
Rowers at the 2020 Summer Olympics
American male rowers
Olympic rowers of the United States
Cornell Big Red rowers
Sportspeople from Pittsburgh
21st-century American people
Central Catholic High School (Pittsburgh) alumni